Viola Farber (February 25, 1931 – December 24, 1998) was an American choreographer and dancer.

Biography
Viola Farber was born on February 25, 1931, in Heidelberg, Germany. In Germany, Farber began dancing.  However, at the age of six she was told by her parents, “No, you cannot do this anymore”.  At the age of seven, Farber and her family moved to the United States.  Even though her parents did not allow her to dance, Farber continued dancing on her own, though she focused more of her energy on learning to play the piano.  During the one year that Farber spent at the University of Illinois studying music, she began taking dance classes from Margaret Erlanger. When Farber transferred to George Washington University, she focused on both music and dance.  By 1952, Farber had transferred once again, to Black Mountain College was dance with Katherine Litz and music with Lou Harrison.

In 1953, Farber became a founding member of the Merce Cunningham Dance Company.  She created many roles in Cunningham's works, such as Crises, Paired Rune, and Nocturne.  Farber is described as being “one of the great individualists of the company”.  At this time, she also took various dance classes from Margaret Craske and Alfred Corvino in New York, and from Erika Thimey in Washington, D.C.  Additionally, Farber was dancing with other choreographers.  She performed the role of the vampire in Litz's Dracula as well as dancing with Paul Taylor's early company.  Farber was the only female pianist in the first performance of Erik Satie's Vexations (organized by John Cage, and lasting over 18 hours). In 1965, she left Cunningham's company and in 1968, began her own company.

Viola Farber’s Dance Company and style
Through having her own dance company, The Viola Farber Dance Company, Farber was able to develop her own dance style.  She often used improvisation in her rehearsals and in some of her first works.  She allowed her dancers to rearrange and reshape the movement, however she set explicit limits.  Her dancers were allowed to do whatever they wanted ”.  Farber would almost ask dancers to manipulate the phrase and provided cues for beginning different sections.  Although, these cues were never related to the music.  Jeff Slayton, a member of the company and Farber’s longtime partner and ex-husband, commented that “if a dance had internal or set musical cues, we changed the music”.  Her work challenged audiences and was often found compelling.  The pieces Poor Eddie (1973) and Willi I (1974) were described as sadomasochistic, while No Super, No Boiler (1974) and Lead Us Not into Penn Station (1975) had humorous themes, and Dune and Nightshade (both choreographed in the early 1970s) had quiet themes.  Most of the Farber's pieces were set to original scores, or were performed in silence.  However, a few of her pieces were choreographed to classical music.  For example, Nightshade was set to Beethoven's Piano Sonata No. 14.

Farber died on December 24, 1998, in Bronxville, New York.

Works

Choreography by Viola Farber for Viola Farber Dance Company 
1968

 Excerpt

1969

 Duet For Mirjam and Jeff
 Quota 
 Passage 
 Standby  

1970

 Tendency
 Area Code
 Curriculum
 Co-Op
 Mildred

1971

 Survey
 Patience

1972

 Default
 Route 6
 Dune
 Poor Eddie

1973

 Soup
 Spare Change

1974

 Willi I
 Some of the Symptoms
 Dinosaur Parts
 No Super, No Boiler
 Defendant
 Houseguest

1975

 Motorcycle/Boat
 Night Shade
 Duet For Willi and Susan

1976

 Five Works For Sneakers
 Some Things I Can Remember
 Sunday Afternoon

1977

 Brazos River (Collaboration with Robert Rauschenberg, David Tudor, Fort Worth Museum – Dance on Camera)
 Lead Us Not Into Penn Station
 Solo

1978

 Turf
 Doublewalk
 Private Relations
 Dandelion
 Local

1979

 Duet
 Ledge
 Tide

1980

 Tracks
 Bright Stream

1981

 Bequest

Choreography for Viola Farber Dance Company while in residency at Le Centre National de Dance Contemporaine d’Angers (The French National Center for Contemporary Dance) 1981-1983 
1981

 Cinq Pour Dix
 Attente
 Villa-Duage

1982

 Etudes
 Echanges

1983

 Écritures Sur L’Eau

Other works choreographed by Viola Farber 
1965

 Seconds (Solo for Viola Farber)

1965

 Notebook (Quartet for June Finch, Margaret Jenkins, Dan Wagoner, and Rosalind Newman)

1968

 Time Out (Solo for Viola Farber)
 Legacy (Solo for Viola Farber)

1969

 Tristan and Iseult (Duet collaboration with Don Redlich)
 The Music of Conlon Nancarrow (Collaboration with Peter Saul)

1970

 Passengers (Repertory Dance Theater- Utah)

1971

 Pop. 18 (Ohio State University, Columbus)
 Pop. 11 (NYU Performing Arts)
 Five In The Morning (Repertory Dance Theater)

1972

 Window (Ruth Currier Dance Company)

1973

 Untitled Work (University of Michigan, Ann Arbor)

1975

 Minnesota Mash (University of Minnesota, Minn.)

1976

 Untitled Work (Margaret Jenkins Workshop in San Francisco)
 Temporary Site (Nancy Hauser Dance Company, Minneapolis)

1977

 Autumn Fields (Ballet Theatre Contemporaine, Angers)
 Untitled Work (Viola Farber Workshop, NYC)
 Transfer (Nancy Hauser Dance Company, Minneapolis)

1979

 Jeux Choréographique (Ballet Theatre Français and Larry Clark in Lyon, France)
 Clearing (Solo for Ze’eva Cohen)

1980

 Untitled Work (Janet Gillespie and Present Co.)
 Just Correspondence (Duet/collaboration – Viola Farber and Jeff Slayton)

1981

 Tea For Three (Duet for Viola Farber and Sarah Stackhouse)
 Untitled Work (Solo for Susannah Payton-Newman)
 Untitled Work (Viola Farber Workshop, NYC)

1982

 Meanwhile Back In the City (Duet/collaboration Viola Farber and Jeff Slayton)

1983

 Untitled Work (Duet/collaboration Viola Farber and Jeff Slayton)

1984

 Last Waltz (Duet/collaboration Viola Farber and Jeff Slayton)
 Day’s Return (Long Beach Summer School of Dance – CSULB)
 Venom and Antidotes (London Contemporary Dance School)
 Autumn Edge (London Contemporary Dance School)

1985

 January – (Last performance of Viola Farber Dance Company – Dance made for television in Devon, England – Television South West London)

1987

 Bank Holiday (London Contemporary Dance School)
 Passing (London Contemporary Dance School)
 Winter Rumors (Extemporary Dance Theatre, London)
 Take-Away (Extemporary Dance Theatre, London)
 Preludes (Nation Youth Dance Company, London)

1988

 Preludes (New Dance Ensemble – Minneapolis, Minn.)

1989

 Last Call (Solo for Douglas Nielsen)

1992

 Ainsi de Suite (Duet/collaboration Viola Farber and Mathilde Monnier)

1994

 Threestep (Ship Wreck) – (Duet/collaboration Viola Farber and Ralph Lemon

1996

 Dreams of Wind and Dust (CE DE CE, Setubal, Portugal)
 It’s Been A While (Duet/collaboration Viola Farber and Jeff Slayton)

Notable projects
1970s: Brazos River, video collaboration with Robert Rauschenberg and David Tudor
1974: Made site-specific dances at the Bronx Botanical Gardens and in the Staten Island Ferry waiting room.
Sunday Afternoon (1976) and Private Relations (1979): Farber choreographed these works with a more relaxed feel.

Teaching career
Adelphi University (1959–1967) 
Cunningham Studio (1961–1969) 
Bennington College (1967–1968) 
Appointed by French government to artistic director of Centre National de Danse Contemporiane in Angers (1981–1983) 
Sarah Lawrence College Director of Dance Department (1988–1998)

References

1931 births
1998 deaths
American choreographers
Black Mountain College alumni
American women choreographers
20th-century American dancers
American female dancers
20th-century American women
People from Heidelberg
German emigrants to the United States
Adelphi University faculty
Bennington College faculty
Sarah Lawrence College faculty